The Haune is a 67 km long river in Hesse, Germany, right tributary of the Fulda. Its source is near Dietershausen, southeast of the town Fulda, in the Rhön Mountains. The Haune flows generally north through the towns Hünfeld, Burghaun and Haunetal. It flows into the Fulda in Bad Hersfeld.

References

Rivers of Hesse
East Hesse
Rivers of Germany